De Weere can refer to two villages in the Netherlands, both in the province of North Holland:

 De Weere, Hollands Kroon
 De Weere, Opmeer